Spain competed at the 2019 World Championships in Athletics in Doha, Qatar, from 27 September to 6 October 2019.

Medalists 
The following competitors from Spain won medals at the 2019 World Championships.

Results 
The Spanish Athletics Federation named the first athletes of the team.

Men
Track and road events

Field events

Women
Track and road events

Field events

References

Nations at the 2019 World Athletics Championships
World Championships in Athletics
Spain at the World Championships in Athletics